Léon François Chervet was a French sculptor, a representative of the high quality of design and execution engendered by the training of the official French École des Beaux-Arts, even among artists of the second rank in reputation.

His allegorical sculpture, now called "Amphitrite" (illustration) is his only public sculpture. She formerly stood on the façade of the Palais du Trocadéro, Paris, built for the Exposition Universelle (1878) and demolished to make way for the Exposition of 1937. She was preserved and offered to the city of Agde, where, as "Amphitrite", she now symbolizes Agde's maritime vocation in the place de la Marine.

Chervet exhibited at the annual salons at the Palais des Champs-Elysées, Paris, often hors concours, as sculptures acquired by the State

Notes

External links

Year of birth missing
Year of death missing
19th-century French sculptors
French male sculptors
19th-century French male artists